Austrochaperina macrorhyncha is a species of frog in the family Microhylidae.
It is endemic to West Papua, Indonesia.
Its natural habitats are subtropical or tropical moist lowland forests and subtropical or tropical moist montane forests.

References

Sources
 Richards, S. & Günther, R. 2004.  Austrochaperina macrorhyncha.   2006 IUCN Red List of Threatened Species.   Downloaded on 23 July 2007.

Austrochaperina
Amphibians of Western New Guinea
Taxonomy articles created by Polbot
Amphibians described in 1906